María Alejandra Peraza Romero (born 17 January 1994) is a Venezuelan footballer who plays as a centre back for Liga MX Femenil club Cruz Azul. She has been a member of the Venezuela women's national team.

International career
Peraza represented Venezuela at the 2014 South American U-20 Women's Championship. At senior level, she played the 2014 Copa América Femenina.

References

External links

1994 births
Living people
Sportspeople from Barquisimeto
Venezuelan women's footballers
Women's association football central defenders
Women's association football midfielders
Caracas F.C. (women) players
L.D.U. Quito Femenino players
Independiente Santa Fe (women) players
Millonarios F.C. players
Atlético Nacional (women) players
Cruz Azul (women) footballers
Venezuela women's international footballers
Venezuelan expatriate women's footballers
Venezuelan expatriate sportspeople in Ecuador
Expatriate women's footballers in Ecuador
Venezuelan expatriate sportspeople in Colombia
Expatriate women's footballers in Colombia
Venezuelan expatriate sportspeople in Mexico
Expatriate women's footballers in Mexico